Elmo Alexander Plaskett (June 27, 1938 – November 2, 1998) was a professional baseball player from the United States Virgin Islands. He played as a catcher, outfielder and third baseman in Major League Baseball.

After signing with the Pirates in 1957, he rose through the Pittsburgh organization on the strength of his batting skills. He hit over .289 in six different minor league stops and in 1962 he led the high-level Sally League in batting (.349) while smashing 27 home runs. Recalled by Pittsburgh that September, he went hitless in his first two appearances, which came as a pinch hitter; but in his third game, September 17 against the San Francisco Giants, he slugged a three-run homer, the winning blow in a 5–2 Pittsburgh triumph at Forbes Field; as the starting catcher, he handled Tom Sturdivant's complete game.

Plaskett finished his first MLB trial with four hits in 14 at bats (.286) and was a member of Pittsburgh's 40-man winter roster. Coming out of spring training in 1963, he made the Bucs' 28-man early-season squad and got into ten games, with three starts at catcher. But he collected only three hits, all singles, and was demoted to Triple-A Columbus. He spent the rest of his career in the minors and in winter baseball, retiring from the former in 1969 and the latter in 1971.

In retirement he briefly scouted for the Pirates, and remained integrally involved in youth baseball in his native USVI until his death at age 60 in Christiansted.

References

External links

Rory Costello, Elmo Plaskett. SABR Biography Project

1938 births
1998 deaths
Asheville Tourists players
Birmingham A's players
Clinton Pirates players
Columbus/Gastonia Pirates players
Columbus Jets players
Dallas Rangers players
Grand Forks Chiefs players
Hawaii Islanders players
Jamestown Falcons players
Kinston Eagles players
Las Vegas Wranglers players
Lincoln Chiefs players
Macon Peaches players
Major League Baseball catchers
Major League Baseball players from the United States Virgin Islands
Peninsula Grays players
People from Saint Croix, U.S. Virgin Islands
Pittsburgh Pirates players
Pittsburgh Pirates scouts
Rochester Red Wings players
San Jose Pirates players
Vancouver Mounties players
United States Virgin Islands expatriate baseball players in Canada